The Gap Band II is the fourth studio album by the Gap Band, released in 1979 on Mercury Records. It is their second major label release, and produced by Lonnie Simmons.

Reception

The album reached No. 3 on the Black Albums chart and No. 42 on the Pop Albums chart. The album produced the singles "Steppin' (Out)" (No. 10 Black Singles), "Party Lights" (No. 36 Black Singles), and "I Don't Believe You Want to Get up and Dance (Oops!)" (No. 4 Black Singles, No. 52 Club Play Singles).

The album established the Gap Band as leaders in the R&B market, becoming their first gold album, selling over 500,000 copies through 1980. The album's most successful track, "I Don't Believe You Want to Get up and Dance (Oops!)", was their first to incorporate aspects of the P-Funk sound. The song also alludes to a well-known corruption of the childhood nursery rhyme, Jack and Jill (a pattern later continued on "Humpin'").

Track listing

Personnel
Charlie Wilson - Keyboards, Synthesizer, Percussion, Lead and Backing Vocals
Ronnie Wilson - Trumpet, Keyboards, Backing Vocals
Robert Wilson -  Bass, Backing Vocals (Lead vocals on "Who Do You Call")
Greg Phillinganes - Keyboards, Percussion, Synthesizer
John Black, Louie Cabaza - Keyboards
Emzie Parker III, Glenn Nightingale, James Macon - Guitar
Raymond Calhoun -  Drums, Percussion
Ronnie Kaufman - Drums
Malvin "Dino" Vice, Trumpet, Backing Vocals, Horn Arrangements
Oliver "Gussie" Scott - Trombone - Backing Vocals
Malvin "Dino" Vice - Horn Arrangements
Benjamin Wright - String Arrangements
Bernard Baisden - Trombone 
Fernando Harkless - Tenor Saxophone
Lois Peoples, Angela Smith, Calvin Yarbrough, Gail Johnson, Howard Huntsberry, Robert "Goodie" Whitfield, Rudolph Taylor - Backing Vocals

Charts

Weekly charts

Year-end charts

Singles

References

External links
 
 The Gap Band II at Discogs

1979 albums
The Gap Band albums
Mercury Records albums
Albums recorded at Total Experience Recording Studios